Ten Songs for Another World is the third  and final studio album by The World of Skin, released in 1990 by Young God Records.

Accolades

Track listing

Personnel
Adapted from the Ten Songs for Another World liner notes.

Musicians
 Michael Gira – vocals, acoustic guitar, keyboards, sampler, tape, drum programming, percussion, production, photography, design
 Jarboe – vocals, keyboards, piano, backing vocals
 Additional musicians
 Tony Maimone – bass guitar (4)
 Roli Mosimann – drum programming (4)
 Andrea Pennisi – percussion (3)
 Clinton Steele – electric guitar, acoustic guitar (1, 3–6, 9)

Production and additional personnel
 Keith Maltbey – photography
 Steve McAllister – recording, mixing, percussion
 Howie Weinberg – mastering

Release history

References

External links 
 

1990 albums
Albums produced by Michael Gira
Young God Records albums